Paul Schulte (born 1979) is an American Paralympic wheelchair basketball player.

Biography
Schulte was born in Ann Arbor, Michigan. When he was 10 he got into a car crash and was paralyzed since then. At the age of 14 he participated in his first wheelchair basketball game and by 2002 received a degree in mechanical engineering from the University of Texas at Arlington. After college, he became Dallas Mavericks' player and later became their coach.

In 1995 he was an NWBA Junior Division Champion and in 1997 won a silver medal at Under 23 World Championship. In 1998, Schulte was awarded with a gold medal at the IWBF World Championship while in 2006 he became a silver medalist and later in 2010 got a bronze medal all of which were in the same place. A year later, he was awarded a gold medal at the 2011 Parapan American Games and during the 2000 and 2012 Summer Paralympics he was awarded with some more bronze medals. He was also a four-time NWBA Champion in 2003, 2005, 2007, and 2009. Currently he is married to a woman named Meghan and has an eight-year-old son Brady. As of 2013 he was named National Wheelchair Basketball Associations' MVP five times in a row.

References

External links
 
 

1979 births
Living people
Basketball players from Ann Arbor, Michigan
Paralympic wheelchair basketball players of the United States
Paralympic bronze medalists for the United States
Paralympic medalists in wheelchair basketball
American men's wheelchair basketball players
Wheelchair basketball players at the 2000 Summer Paralympics
Wheelchair basketball players at the 2008 Summer Paralympics
Wheelchair basketball players at the 2012 Summer Paralympics
Medalists at the 2000 Summer Paralympics
Medalists at the 2012 Summer Paralympics
UT Arlington Mavericks men's wheelchair basketball players
21st-century American people